The Australian Journal of Primary Health is a quarterly peer-reviewed healthcare journal published by CSIRO Publishing on behalf of the Australian Institute for Primary Care and Ageing (La Trobe University). It was established in 1995 as the Australian Journal of Primary Health Interchange and obtained its current name in 2001. The journal covers all aspects of community health services and primary health care.

The current Editors-in-Chief are Amanda Kenny and Virginia Lewis.

Abstracting and indexing 
The journal is abstracted and indexed in Applied Social Sciences Index and Abstracts, Australasian Medical Index, Australian Public Affairs Information Service, CINAHL, Embase, Google Scholar, Journal Citation Reports (Sciences Edition), Journal Citation Reports (Social Sciences Edition), MEDLINE, Science Citation Index Expanded, Scopus, Social Sciences Citation Index, Social SciSearch, Social Services Abstracts and Sociological Abstracts.

Impact factor 
According to the Journal Citation Reports, the journal has a 2015 impact factor of 1.152.

References

External links 
 

Publications established in 1995
Public health journals
CSIRO Publishing academic journals
Quarterly journals
English-language journals
La Trobe University
Primary care
Academic journals associated with universities and colleges of Australia